Stefan Kozlov (born February 1, 1998) is an American professional tennis player of Russian descent. He has a career-high ATP ranking of world No. 103 achieved on 18 July 2022 and doubles ranking of world No. 180 on 19 June 2017.

Kozlov made his ATP World Tour debut as a wildcard in 2013 Hall of Fame Tennis Championships at the age of 15. He reached two junior Grand Slam finals in 2014 and finished the year at World No. 3 in the ITF Junior Combined rankings.

Personal life
He is the son of Russian parents and his father Andrei is a tennis coach.

Junior career
In 2014, Kozlov reached two junior grand slam finals, where he lost to Alexander Zverev at the Australian Open and Noah Rubin at Wimbledon. This success led him to a career high junior ranking of No. 2. Kozlov also competed at the U18 National Championships, finishing in third place in the singles tournament and winning the doubles tournament with Noah Rubin. With this victory, they earned a wild card into the main draw of the 2014 US Open. He ended the year by winning the Orange Bowl junior tournament.

In 2015, Kozlov reached the final of the U18 National Championships, where he lost to Frances Tiafoe in five sets.

Professional career

Early years

In 2013, Kozlov made his ATP World Tour debut as a wildcard at the Newport tournament and lost in the first round. At the age of 16, he defeated his first Top 100 player in Tim Smyczek to reach his first ATP Challenger final in 2014 in Sacramento, where he lost to  Sam Querrey. He also reached seven career ITF Futures finals and won four of these finals.

2016-17: First ATP win and quarterfinal, Two Challenger titles
In April, Kozlov reached the final at the Open de Guadeloupe. In June, he won his first career ATP level match as a wildcard at the 2016 Ricoh Open in Den Bosch. He reached his first career quarterfinal by defeating Steve Johnson in the second round. Toward the end of the season, Kozlov reached a second Challenger final on the year at Suzhou. He won his first career Challenger event in Columbus. He won his second title at the 2017 Las Vegas Challenger.

2021: First three Challenger titles since 2017, return to top 200 since 2018
In September, at the 2021 Columbus Challenger, Kozlov won his first title in four years, defeating Max Purcell in the final in three sets. At the same tournament he won also in doubles partnering Canadian Peter Polansky. He followed this by a final at the 2021 Las Vegas Challenger and a second Challenger title for the season at the 2021 Charlottesville Men's Pro Challenger, defeating another Australian Aleksandar Vukic. As a result, he returned to the top 200 in more than three years at No. 188 on November 8, 2021. He ended the year with winning his third Challenger in Champaign, US. As a result he finished the year ranked World No. 159 on 22 November 2021.

2022: Grand Slam debut & first win, second ATP quarterfinal & career-high ranking
At the 2022 Australian Open he made his debut as a wildcard and won his first Grand Slam match against Jiří Veselý. He lost in the second round to 7th seed Matteo Berrettini.

As a qualifier at the 2022 Delray Beach Open, he reached his second career quarterfinal after defeating Emilio Gómez and Steve Johnson.

Ranked No. 130 at the 2022 Abierto Mexicano Telcel in Acapulco, he reached the main draw as lucky loser and defeated Grigor Dimitrov in a stunning upset in three sets after fighting cramps, in the longest match in Acapulco history. It was the biggest win in his career.

At the 2022 Wimbledon Championships, he made his debut at this Major when he entered the main draw as a lucky loser after the late withdrawal of Borna Ćorić. Kozlov lost in straight sets to 12th seed Diego Schwartzman. He reached a new career high ranking of No. 103 on 18 July 2022.

Performance timeline

Singles
Current through the 2023 Australian Open.

ATP Challenger and ITF Futures finals

Singles: 18 (9–9)

Doubles: 12 (6–6)

Junior Grand Slam finals

Singles: 2 (2 runner-ups)

Doubles: 1 (1 runner-up)

References

External links
 
 

1998 births
Living people
American male tennis players
American people of Russian descent
Sportspeople from Skopje
Sportspeople from Pembroke Pines, Florida